Larry DeShazor was an American politician from Michigan. A member of the Michigan State House of Representatives, DeShazor left the state house in 2011 after an unsuccessful run for the State Senate.

Political life
DeShazor ran for the Michigan State House of Representatives in 2008 and was elected, becoming one of two African American Republicans elected to the Michigan House of Representatives since 1904, the other being Paul H. Scott.

References

Year of birth missing (living people)
Living people
Republican Party members of the Michigan House of Representatives
African-American state legislators in Michigan
21st-century American politicians
21st-century African-American politicians